Bleckley may refer to:

People:
Erwin R. Bleckley (1894–1918), United States Army Air Service aviator during World War I, and posthumous recipient of the Medal of Honor
Logan Edwin Bleckley (1827–1907), American lawyer and jurist

Locations:
Bleckley County, Georgia, county located in the U.S. state of Georgia
Bleckley County High School, high school in Cochran, Georgia, USA, 120 miles south of Atlanta
Bleckley County School District, public school district in Bleckley County, Georgia, USA, based in Cochran, Georgia

See also
Blackley
Bletchley